Looking Ahead is an album by saxophonist Ricky Ford which was recorded in 1986 and released on the Muse label.

Reception

The AllMusic review by Ron Wynn stated "An outstanding session, with a first-rate supporting cast".

Track listing
All compositions by Ricky Ford except where noted
 "Onward Forward" – 5:50
 "Back to America" – 4:39
 "Conga Brava" (Duke Ellington, Juan Tizol) – 4:48
 "Ancient Air" – 5:31
 "Circle of Ben" – 4:27
 "Living Doll" – 4:52
 "Supra Chances" - 6:27
 "Quiet Reflections" – 3:15

Personnel
Ricky Ford - tenor saxophone
James Spaulding – alto saxophone, flute (tracks 1 2, 4 & 6)
John Sass – tuba (tracks 1 2, 4 & 6)
Kirk Lightsey – piano 
Cecil McBee – bass 
Freddie Waits – drums

References

Muse Records albums
Ricky Ford albums
1987 albums
Albums recorded at Van Gelder Studio
Albums produced by Michael Cuscuna